Ajalvir is a town and municipality in the Autonomous Community of Madrid in central Spain, located  north-east of Madrid and  from Alcalá de Henares. It is located in the comarca of Alcalá.

The name Ajalvir is believed to have derived from the Arabic al-jalaoui, meaning isolated or separated.

Geography 
Ajalvir is bordered to the north with Cobeña, to the east with Daganzo de Arriba, to the west with Paracuellos de Jarama and to the south with Torrejón de Ardoz. The town is crossed right by its centre by a creek, possibly a tributary of the "de la Huelga" stream. The area is slightly hilly, the highest peak is called "Cabeza Gorda" (fat head) of 767 meters, close to the "cerro del tordo" (hill of the thrush).

Bus 

 215: Torrejón de Ardoz-Paracuellos del Jarama. (ALSA)
 251: Torrejón de Ardoz-Valdeavero-Alcalá de Henares. (ALSA)
 252: Torrejón de Ardoz-Daganzo-Alcalá de Henares. (ALSA)
 254: Valdeolmos/Fuente el Saz-Alcalá de Henares. (ALSA)
 256: Madrid (Canillejas)-Daganzo-Valdeavero. (ALSA)
 N204: Madrid (Canillejas)-Paracuellos-Daganzo. (night bus line) (ALSA)

References

External links 
 

Municipalities in the Community of Madrid